Reichardia ligulata is a species of plant in the tribe Cichorieae within the family Asteraceae native to the Canary Islands (Tenerife, Grand Canaria and La Palma) where it grows on rocky coastal slopes and cliffs.

Cichorieae